William Gay or variants may refer to:

Sportspeople
Willie Gay (baseball) (1909–1970), American baseball player
Bill Gay (1927–2008), American football defensive back
William Gay (defensive lineman) (born 1955), retired American NFL player
William Gay (cornerback) (born 1985), American NFL player drafted by the Pittsburgh Steelers in 2007
Willie Gay (born 1998), American football linebacker

Other people
William Gay (author) (1941–2012), American writer of novels and short stories
William Gay (landscape gardener and surveyor) (1814–1893), British landscape gardener and surveyor
Frank William Gay (1920–2007), also known as Bill Gay, American businessman
William Gay (poet) (1865–1897), Scottish-born Australian poet

See also
William G. Brown Sr. (1800–1884), American politician from Virginia and West Virginia
William Gay Brown Jr. (1856–1916), American politician from West Virginia